Peter Horn (15 October 1915 – 1 November 1983) was a Danish fighter pilot.
Horn was born on 15 October 1915. He joined the Danish Army and trained as a pilot, graduating as a qualified pilot in 1937 (certificate 214/37). On 9 October 1938 he was made Sekondløjtnant (2nd Lieutenant) and at the outbreak of war, was a Lieutenant in the reserve.

References

 https://web.archive.org/web/20130921053652/http://www.danishww2pilots.dk/pilots.php?id=160

1915 births
Danish military officers
Danish World War II flying aces
Luftwaffe personnel of World War II
Luftwaffe pilots
Danish collaborators with Nazi Germany
Recipients of the Iron Cross (1939), 1st class
Recipients of the Iron Cross (1939), 2nd class
1983 deaths